Duncan Barrett is a writer and editor who specialises in biography and memoir. After publishing several books in collaboration with other authors, he published his first solo book, Men of Letters, in 2014. Barrett also works as an actor and theatre director.

Early life
Duncan was born in Islington, London in 1983 and went to City of London School from 1994 to 2001, before studying English at Jesus College, Cambridge, where he served as Film Editor of student newspaper Varsity. He is the author of Star Trek: The Human Frontier, co-written with his mother Michele Barrett and published by Polity Press in 2000. He edited Vitali Vitaliev's travelogue Passport to Enclavia, published by Reportage Press in 2008.

Work as writer and editor
Barrett was the editor of Ronald Skirth's pacifist First World War memoir The Reluctant Tommy, published by Macmillan in 2010. In it he wrote that, having come across Skirth's memoir through his mother's research, he felt determined that it should be read by a wide audience. The book was favourably reviewed by Richard Holmes in the Evening Standard and Jonathan Gibbs in the Financial Times, Socialist Worker and the Sunday Express. However, it came under attack from critics who objected to its pacifist politics and questioned its accuracy. In a revised introduction to the paperback edition (2011), Barrett defended the memoir, encouraging people to "read the book for yourself and make up your own mind who to believe".

In 2012, Collins published The Sugar Girls, a book co-written by Barrett with Nuala Calvi, telling the stories of women workers at Tate & Lyle's East End factories since the Second World War. It soon became a best-seller. In an article for History Workshop Online, Barrett wrote that, while their methodology was indebted to oral history, the end result was a work of narrative non-fiction. The authors were inspired by Jennifer Worth's Call the Midwife, which was their "touchstone" as they wrote. The book is accompanied by a blog, where Barrett and Calvi discuss broader issues of life and work in the East End of London in the period covered by the book, as well as posting photographs and audio clips of the women they interviewed.

In 2013, Barrett and Calvi's second book together, GI Brides, was published by Harper, based on interviews with British women who married Americans during the Second World War. It soon became a Sunday Times best-seller. The following year, a US edition of the book went into The New York Times nonfiction bestseller list.

Barrett and Calvi's third collaboration for HarperCollins, The Girls Who Went to War, tells the true stories of women who served in the Army, Navy and Air Force during the Second World War. The book was published on 7 May 2015, and launched the following day to commemorate the 70th anniversary of VE-Day. On 17 May 2015, it went into the Sunday Times bestseller list at number 6.

In 2014, Barrett's first solo book, Men of Letters was published by AA Publishing. The book tells the story of the Post Office Rifles during the First World War.

Work in theatre
Barrett also works as an actor and theatre director. He trained at Central School of Speech and Drama, graduating in 2006. In 2007 he played John Walker in Eastern Angles' production of Arthur Ransome's We Didn't Mean to Go to Sea and was praised for "neatly avoid[ing] any jolly hockeysticks". In 2011 he was seen as W. T. Tutte in the BBC's Code-breakers and in 2012 as Paul Winder in National Geographic's Locked up Abroad.

Barrett has often worked on the plays of Shakespeare and other dramatists. He is the director of the short film Exit Strategy (2010), adapted from Shakespeare's Troilus and Cressida. He played Frederick in a production of Aphra Behn's The Rover at the Edinburgh Fringe 2006. The previous year he played the title role in Shakespeare's Richard II at the festival. In 2004, he directed All's Well That Ends Well at the festival, with a cast including Joe Thomas of The Inbetweeners.

Bibliography
Notes

References 
 - Total pages: 324

External links
The Sugar Girls website
GI Brides website
The Girls Who Went to War website

1983 births
Living people
20th-century English writers
21st-century English memoirists
21st-century English male actors
People from Islington (district)
Writers from London
Alumni of Jesus College, Cambridge
People educated at the City of London School
English biographers
English book editors
English theatre directors